Stylopsis marioni is a species of sea snail, a marine gastropod mollusk in the family Pyramidellidae, the pyrams and their allies.

This is a taxon inquirendum.

References

 Locard A. (1897-1898). Expéditions scientifiques du Travailleur et du Talisman pendant les années 1880, 1881, 1882 et 1883. Mollusques testacés. Paris, Masson. vol. 1 [1897], p. 1-516 pl. 1-22; vol. 2 [1898], p. 1-515, pl. 1-18

External links
 To World Register of Marine Species

Pyramidellidae
Gastropods described in 1897